Kuppuswami Naidu Veeraswami (1914-2010) was Chief Justice of the Madras High Court in India from 5 January 1969 to 3 November 1976.

References

Chief Justices of the Madras High Court
1914 births
2010 deaths
Telugu people